Marie Cathérine Riollet (1755 – 1788) was a French engraver.

Riollet was born in Paris and is known for engravings after popular painters, mostly for catalogs. She married late and became the third wife of fellow engraver Jacques Firmin Beauvarlet, but died the next year. She signed her works Mlle Riollet.

Riollet died in Paris.

References

1755 births
1788 deaths
Engravers from Paris
Women engravers